WJCT-FM (89.9 MHz) is a public radio station in Jacksonville, Florida. Owned by WJCT, Inc., it is an NPR member station. It shares studios with its sister PBS station WJCT (channel 7) on Festival Park Avenue, near TIAA Bank Field in Downtown Jacksonville's Stadium District. Its transmitter facilities are located on Hogan Road in the city's Killarney Shores area.

HD Radio
WJCT broadcasts in HD Radio; it broadcasts three full-time subchannels, Classical 24 on HD2— which carries classical music, Anthology on HD3 - which carries classic hits, and "The Independent" on HD4 - which carries adult album alternative. 

From September to November 2019, the station ran a country music subchannel, Pop-Up Country, on HD4, as a tie-in to Ken Burns' PBS documentary series Country Music.

On July 13, 2020, WJCT-FM converted from its previous mix of news and music into an all-news/talk format with its music programs moved to its HD radio subchannels. On this date, the station became known as WJCT News 89.9.

On April 28, 2022, WJCT-FM's HD4 subchannel changed its format from lounge as "Electro Lounge Radio" to adult album alternative as "The Independent"

References

External links

NPR member stations
JCT-FM
Radio stations established in 1972
1972 establishments in Florida
News and talk radio stations in the United States